Browning Pass is an ice-covered pass,  long, lying between the main mass of Deep Freeze Range and the Northern Foothills in Victoria Land, Antarctica. The pass facilitates movement between the lower ends of Priestley Glacier and Campbell Glacier. The feature was first mapped as a part of Campbell Glacier by the Northern Party of the British Antarctic Expedition, 1910–13 (BrAE). It was remapped by the Southern Party of the New Zealand Geological Survey Antarctic Expedition, 1962–63, and named for Frank V. Browning, a member of the BrAE Northern Party, for whom nearby Mount Browning is also named.

See also
 List of airports in Antarctica

References 

Mountain passes of Victoria Land
Scott Coast